Gabrielle Rose "Rosey" Fletcher (born November 30, 1975, in Anchorage, Alaska) is an American snowboarder. She competed at the 1998 Winter Olympics in Nagano, the 2002 Winter Olympics in Salt Lake City, and the 2006 Winter Olympics in Turin, Italy. Fletcher won bronze in the 2006 women's Parallel Giant Slalom event.

On March 5, 2006, in Soldotna, Alaska Rosey Fletcher received the honor of lighting the cauldron in the opening ceremony of the Kenai Peninsula 2006 Arctic Winter Games.

References

External links
 FIS-Ski.com Biography/Results

1975 births
American female snowboarders
Living people
Medalists at the 2006 Winter Olympics
Snowboarders at the 1998 Winter Olympics
Snowboarders at the 2002 Winter Olympics
Snowboarders at the 2006 Winter Olympics
Sportspeople from Anchorage, Alaska
Olympic bronze medalists for the United States in snowboarding
21st-century American women